The Litter Act 1979 may refer to:
Litter Act 1979 (New Zealand)
Litter Act 1979 (Western Australia)